Onuimo is a Local Government Area of Imo State, Nigeria. Its headquarters are in the town of Okwe. It comprises four towns namely: Okwe, Okwelle, Umuduru-Egbeaguru and Umuna. It is home to very prominent Nigerians such as The ever influential dynamic estate surveyor; Prof. James Gaius Ibe- USA trained and tenured professor of economics, finance and business administration, Dr Dennis Ndububa-a graduate of UNN with close to 40 years of professional practice as a medical doctor; Dr. Victor Ndububa; Dr. Christian Egemba; Dr. Kaunda Ibe-Consultant Neurosurgeon at Imo State University Teaching Hospital Orlu Imo State; Dr. Geraldine Echue-winner in Global Chemistry competition; Chief Adol N. Obi - the former bursar of Federal Polytechnic Nekede Owerri, and Engr Ekene Echefu - a lecturer in Mechatronics engineering department, federal polytechnic Nekede Owerri.Taiwo Damilola also served there. Also American author and writer Dreux Richard resides in Okwe to complete his writing when in Nigeria.
 
It has an area of 87 km2 and a population of 99,247 at the 2006 census. The postal code of the area is 470.

Gallery

References

Local Government Areas in Imo State
Imo State
Local Government Areas in Igboland
Towns in Imo State